Robert Forbes may refer to:
Robert Forbes (American football) (1886–1947), American football player and coach
Robert Forbes (bishop) (1708–1775), Scottish Episcopal bishop of Ross and Caithness
Robert Bennet Forbes (1804–1889), sea captain, China merchant, ship owner, and writer
Robert Jacobus Forbes (1900–1973), historian of science
Robert Pierce Forbes (born 1958), American historian
Robert C. Forbes (1917–2002), U.S. Army general